Vittorio Emanuele Vincenzo Giuseppe Calestani (1882 – 1949) was an Italian botanist at the University of Modena, whose work included a classification system for angiosperms.

Selected publications

Books 
 Come si studiano le piante: manuale di botanica pratica (1932) Società Editrice "La Scuola", 733 pp.
 Origini della razza italiana: fondamenti della politica razzista (1941) Vol. 26 de Manuali di politica internazionale. Istituto per gli studi di politica internazionale, 298 pp.
 Natura in maschera: mimetismo e appariscenza negli animali e nelle piante (1947) Garzanti, 493 pp.

Other 
 Contributo alla sistematica della Ombrellifere D'Europa (1905) Pubblicazione U. Martelli "Webbia" 
 La vegetazione nei dintorni d' Orvieto (1907) Nuovo Gior. Bot. Ital. (14 ): 546-574
 Mimetismo vegetale (1947) Natura in mascliera, Milano, Garzanti

See also Taxon. Lit., ed. 2 (TL2), ICCU

Legacy 
Vittorio Calestani is the authority for 37 taxa, such as Arabis cardamine Calest.

References

Bibliography 

 
 
 
 
 
 



20th-century Italian botanists
1882 births
1949 deaths